Alessio Canessa (born 12 September 1999) is an Italian football player. He plays for Pro Livorno Sorgenti in Serie D.

Club career
He is a product of Livorno youth teams and spent the 2017–18 season on loan to Serie D club Ponsacco.

He made his Serie B debut for Livorno on 9 December 2018 in a game against Foggia, as a starter.

References

External links
 

1999 births
Sportspeople from Livorno
Living people
Italian footballers
Association football forwards
U.S. Livorno 1915 players
U.S. Pergolettese 1932 players
Serie B players
Serie C players
Serie D players
Footballers from Tuscany